Mark William Bedford (born 24 August 1961), nicknamed Bedders, is an English musician, songwriter and composer. Bedford came to prominence in the late 1970s as the bass guitarist for the English ska band Madness.

Early life
Mark Bedford was born on 24 August 1961, in Islington, London, England. He started to buy records at the age of 11 or 12. Around this time, he listened to music in the charts and North American artists such as Neil Young. He began to play bass guitar at the age of 13 in order to accompany friends who played the guitar.

Bedford attended William Ellis School in Kentish Town and met members of the North London Invaders at one of their gigs. He was asked to a band rehearsal and was impressed by the musicianship on display. Bedford was friends with the Invaders' drummer Gary Dovey, but after a confrontation with saxophonist Lee Thompson, Dovey left the band. Bedford brought Dan Woodgate into the band, and he was introduced as the final member of the then six-piece group which became Madness.

Career

Although not a major songwriter in Madness, Bedford co-wrote one of the band's more emotive songs "One Better Day" with Suggs. He was also responsible for co-writing "Not Home Today", "Disappear", "Return of the Los Palmas 7", "Deceives the Eye", "Stepping into Line" and "Maybe in Another Life". The only song he wrote entirely on his own was "Mummy's Boy", which appeared on the band's debut album One Step Beyond...

Bedford played double bass on Robert Wyatt's recording of the Elvis Costello song "Shipbuilding" in 1982.

After Madness split for the first time in 1986, Bedford played bass with Voice of the Beehive, and in 1991 played bass on Morrissey's second studio album Kill Uncle. He played double bass on some tracks on the album.

He later teamed up with ex-Higsons brass supremo Terry Edwards, and they formed Butterfield 8 along with various members of the jazz scene at the time. They released a single "Watermelon Man" and an album called Blow! This was re-released in 2001 on the Sartorial Records label.

Bedford's stage performances with Madness became more sporadic after 2009; he did not tour with the band in Australia in the early part of that year, though he did feature as a full member of the band on their album The Liberty of Norton Folgate released that May. Suggs stated: "It’s like the Eagles song ['Hotel California']. You can check out any time you like, but you can never leave...There’s a lot of flexibility, allowing people to be what they want to be, and do what they want."

Bedford took no part in the recording of Oui Oui, Si Si, Ja Ja, Da Da but he appeared in a TV advert with the group, promoting a popular beer. He also performed with the band on the roof of Buckingham Palace in June 2012 as part of Queen Elizabeth II Diamond Jubilee Concert and for the band's appearance in August at the 2012 Summer Olympics closing ceremony. More recently, he appeared with the band on The Jonathan Ross Show on 19 January 2013 and again on 22 March 2013 when the group performed at the official closing ceremony of BBC Television Centre in London.

Since 2011, Bedford has been part of The Lee Thompson Ska Orchestra, a band he put together with Madness saxophonist Lee Thompson. The Lee Thompson Ska Orchestra released their debut album The Benevolence of Sister Mary Ignatius in 2013. They released a single "Fu Man Chu" featuring Bitty McLean from this album, and in February 2014, released a second single "Bangarang" featuring Dawn Penn and Sharon Shannon.

The NJE, a new band with Terry Edwards, released the album Afloat in 2017.

Personal life
In 1987, Bedford started a relationship with Cressida, his long-term partner. They have two daughters, Alice (born 1993) and Olivia (born 1997).

References

External links

1961 births
Living people
20th-century English bass guitarists
21st-century English bass guitarists
English rock bass guitarists
Male bass guitarists
Madness (band) members
People educated at William Ellis School
People from Stoke Newington
English ska bass guitarists
People from Islington (district)